The Chain Reaction is a 1980 Australian science fiction thriller film directed and written by Ian Barry. The film stars Steve Bisley and Arna-Maria Winchester. The film's plot is about an engineer badly injured in an accident caused by an earthquake. He knows that the nuclear waste will poison the groundwater and wants to warn the public.

The movie features many cast members from Mad Max, among them Mel Gibson as a bearded mechanic, in an uncredited cameo. The taglines used in advertising the film included "A fast drive to Paradise turns into a nuclear nightmare!" and "Mad Max meets The China Syndrome"; the latter referring to the car chase and nuclear accident.

The film was rated M in Australia.

Plot
An earthquake in rural Australia causes a dangerous leak at WALDO (Western Atomic Longterm Dumping Organisation), a nuclear waste storage facility. Heinrich Schmidt (Ross Thompson) an engineer badly contaminated in the accident, knows that the leak will poison the groundwater for hundreds of miles around and wants to warn the public. His boss, however, is only interested in protecting himself and believes that the accident should be covered up, when in fact the contamination risks thousands of lives. Heinrich escapes from the facility but is badly injured. Lost in the woods and suffering from amnesia, he is rescued by Larry Stilson (Steve Bisley), a car mechanic on holiday, and his wife Carmel (Arna-Maria Winchester). As Heinrich tries to piece together his memories of what happened, his boss' thugs are quickly closing in on the trio.

Cast
Steve Bisley – Larry Stilson
Arna-Maria Winchester – Carmel Stilson
Ross Thompson – Heinrich Schmidt
Ralph Cotterill – Gray
Hugh Keays-Byrne – Eagle
Lorna Lesley – Gloria
Richard Moir – Junior Constable Pigott
Patrick Ward – Oates
Laurie Moran – Police Sgt. McSweeney
Michael Long – Doctor
Bill McCluskey – Ralph
Margo Lloyd – Molly
Tim Burns – Survey driver
Arthur Sherman - Byron Langley
Barry Donnelly - Gateman
P. J. Jones - Bernie the Beater
David Bracks - Spray Painter
Jone Winchester - Marcia
Joshua Ward - Jason Stillson
Ryan McKibbon - Stephen Stillson
Kim Gyngell - Crabs
Roger Ward - Moose
Sal Sharah - Pellegrini
Frankie J. Holden - Farts
Mel Gibson – Bearded mechanic (uncredited)
Will Taylor – Little kid

Production

The film was the idea of director Ian Barry. He had been talking to producer David Elfick about making a film called Sparks about a blind film director, based on a short film he had made, but Elfick thought the subject matter would be too difficult to finance. Barry had written another film, a thriller then entitled The Man at the Edge of the Freeway, and Elfick decided to make that instead. The movie was budgeted at $600,000 but the Australian Film Commission thought it was too high so it was re-budgeted at $450,000. George Miller came on the project as associate producer.

Funding came from the Australian Film Commission, Victorian Film Corporation and Hoyts. Shooting started in September 1979 and took place in Sydney and Glen Davis, New South Wales. Elfick says the location at Glen Davis was rumoured to be the site of an aboriginal massacre and was supposed to be cursed; he believed it because filming was extremely difficult.

Filming took longer than expected and the movie went 40% over budget. Miller was tasked with directing the car chase sequences, which featured the Ford Fairlane LTD in most scenes as the preferred vehicle of the antagonistic authority chasing Larry's modified Holden HQ ute. David Elfick also filmed some second unit.

The film was shot with a widescreen anamorphic lens. Post production was reputedly very difficult with representatives from the AFC, VFC and Hoyts supervising and discussing every cut of the film.

Distribution
The film was released shortly after Mad Max and it has a similar theme to that film as well as American films like The China Syndrome in regards to the whole nuclear-apocalyptic storyline.

The film was distributed in Australia by Palm Beach Pictures and Warner Bros. in the rest of the world and released on 25 September 1980.

Soundtrack

The music for the film was composed by Andrew Thomas Wilson.

Track listing
 "Awakening" (1:46)
 "The Beast" (4:17)
 "Decontamination" (2:05)
 "Heinrich's Theme" (3:00)
 "WALDO" (1:17)
 "A Swim in the River" (1:48)
 "Chain Reaction" (4:52)
 "Once More with Feeling" (3:00)
 "Paradise Valley" (1:03)
 "Car Chase" (4:31)
 "Carmel's Theme" (1:38)
 "WALDO Arrives" (1:57)
 "The Hand at the Window" (0:42)
 "Message to a Friend" (End tiles)(4:28)

Awards and critical reception

The web page TV Guide.com gave 3 out 4 stars. In Yahoo! Movies, the users rating to the film with a C and 5.5 out of 10 in Internet Movie Database.

Titles around the world

Detector (Italy)
Ketjureaktio (Finland)
Die Kettenreaktion (West Germany)
Nuclear Run
Peligro: reacción en cadena (Spain)
Perigo...Reacção em Cadeia (Portugal)
Skotoste ton, xerei polla! (Greece)
The Man at the Edge of the Freeway* (Australia)
*Working title

Home media
The DVD includes these extras:
Thills and Nuclear Spills: The making of the film (31:37)
The Sparks Obituary (24:50)
Deleted and extended scenes (8:14)
TV Spot (0:32)
Stills and Poster gallery (2:54)
"Theatrical Trailer" (3:19)
Aussie trailers (9:46)
The video presents a 1.70:1 aspect ratio, originally 1.66:1.

Box office
The world-wide distribution rights were bought by Warner Bros. which put the film instantly in profit.  The Chain Reaction grossed A$796,000 at the box office in Australia, which is equivalent to A$3,607,677 in 2021 dollars.

See also
The China Syndrome
The Crazies

References

External links

The Chain Reaction at Oz Movies
The Chain Reaction at Australian Screen Online

1980 films
1980s chase films
1980s disaster films
1980 independent films
1980s science fiction thriller films
Australian independent films
Australian disaster films
Australian science fiction thriller films
Films about automobiles
Films about nuclear accidents and incidents
Films produced by George Miller
Nuclear accidents in fiction
1980s English-language films